The women's aerials competition of the FIS Freestyle World Ski Championships 2013 was held at Myrkdalen-Voss, Norway on March 6 (qualifying)  and March 7 (finals). 
22 athletes from 8 countries competed.

Qualification
The following are the results of the qualification.

Final
The following are the results of the finals.

References 

Aerials, women's